Agrilus betuleti is a species of beetle in the family Buprestidae. It is found in Europe, and was first described as Buprestis betuleti by  Julius Theodor Christian Ratzeburg in 1837
Agrilus betuleti is a species of beetle in the family Buprestidae, commonly known as the bronze birch borer. It is found in North America and Europe, and its larvae feed on the inner bark of birch trees, which can lead to significant damage and mortality of the tree. Adult beetles are metallic bronze in color and are around 1 cm in length. They lay their eggs in cracks in the bark of birch trees, and the larvae burrow into the inner bark, causing galleries or tunnels that disrupt the flow of nutrients and water within the tree. The damage caused by Agrilus betuleti can weaken and eventually kill the birch tree. Control measures include insecticides and pruning of affected branches, but prevention is the most effective strategy, including maintaining the health of birch trees and avoiding planting them in unfavorable conditions.

References

External links 

 Further reading (in Dutch)
 Description (in Dutch)

betuleti
Beetles described in 1837
Taxa named by Julius Theodor Christian Ratzeburg